Hypnosis is a human condition involving focused attention (the selective attention/selective inattention hypothesis, SASI), reduced peripheral awareness, and an enhanced capacity to respond to suggestion.

There are competing theories explaining hypnosis and related phenomena. Altered state theories see hypnosis as an altered state of mind or trance, marked by a level of awareness different from the ordinary state of consciousness. In contrast, non-state theories see hypnosis as, variously, a type of placebo effect, a redefinition of an interaction with a therapist or a form of imaginative role enactment.

During hypnosis, a person is said to have heightened focus and concentration and an increased response to suggestions.
Hypnosis usually begins with a hypnotic induction involving a series of preliminary instructions and suggestions. The use of hypnosis for therapeutic purposes is referred to as "hypnotherapy", while its use as a form of entertainment for an audience is known as "stage hypnosis," a form of mentalism.

Hypnosis-based therapies for the management of irritable bowel syndrome and menopause are supported by evidence. Use of hypnosis for treatment of other problems has produced mixed results, such as with smoking cessation. The use of hypnosis as a form of therapy to retrieve and integrate early trauma is controversial within the scientific mainstream. Research indicates that hypnotising an individual may aid the formation of false memories, and that hypnosis "does not help people recall events more accurately".

Etymology 
The words hypnosis and hypnotism both derive from the term neuro-hypnotism (nervous sleep), all of which were coined by Étienne Félix d'Henin de Cuvillers in the 1820s. The term hypnosis is derived from the ancient Greek ὑπνος hypnos, "sleep", and the suffix -ωσις -osis, or from ὑπνόω hypnoō, "put to sleep" (stem of aorist hypnōs-) and the suffix -is. These words were popularised in English by the Scottish surgeon James Braid (to whom they are sometimes wrongly attributed) around 1841. Braid based his practice on that developed by Franz Mesmer and his followers (which was called "Mesmerism" or "animal magnetism"), but differed in his theory as to how the procedure worked.

History

Precursors 
People have been entering into hypnotic-type trances for thousands of years. In many cultures and religions, it was regarded as a form of meditation. The earliest record of a description of a hypnotic state can be found in the writings of Avicenna, a Persian physician who wrote about "trance" in 1027. Modern-day hypnosis started in the late 18th century and was made popular by Franz Mesmer, a German physician who became known as the father of 'modern hypnotism'. Hypnosis was known at the time as 'Mesmerism' being named after Mesmer.

Mesmer held the opinion that hypnosis was a sort of mystical force that flows from the hypnotist to the person being hypnotised, but his theory was dismissed by critics who asserted that there is no magical element to hypnotism.

Abbé Faria, a Luso-Goan Catholic monk, was one of the pioneers of the scientific study of hypnotism, following on from the work of Franz Mesmer. Unlike Mesmer, who claimed that hypnosis was mediated by "animal magnetism", Faria understood that it worked purely by the power of suggestion.

Before long, hypnotism started finding its way into the world of modern medicine. The use of hypnotism in the medical field was made popular by surgeons and physicians like Elliotson and James Esdaile and researchers like James Braid who helped to reveal the biological and physical benefits of hypnotism. According to his writings, Braid began to hear reports concerning various Oriental meditative practices soon after the release of his first publication on hypnotism, Neurypnology (1843). He first discussed some of these oriental practices in a series of articles entitled Magic, Mesmerism, Hypnotism, etc., Historically & Physiologically Considered. He drew analogies between his own practice of hypnotism and various forms of Hindu yoga meditation and other ancient spiritual practices, especially those involving voluntary burial and apparent human hibernation. Braid's interest in these practices stems from his studies of the Dabistān-i Mazāhib, the "School of Religions", an ancient Persian text describing a wide variety of Oriental religious rituals, beliefs, and practices.

Although he rejected the transcendental/metaphysical interpretation given to these phenomena outright, Braid accepted that these accounts of Oriental practices supported his view that the effects of hypnotism could be produced in solitude, without the presence of any other person (as he had already proved to his own satisfaction with the experiments he had conducted in November 1841); and he saw correlations between many of the "metaphysical" Oriental practices and his own "rational" neuro-hypnotism, and totally rejected all of the fluid theories and magnetic practices of the mesmerists. As he later wrote:

Avicenna 
Avicenna (980–1037), a Persian physician, documented the characteristics of the "trance" (hypnotic trance) state in 1027. At that time, hypnosis as a medical treatment was seldom used; the German doctor Franz Mesmer reintroduced it in the 18th century.

Franz Mesmer 
Franz Mesmer (1734–1815) believed that there is a magnetic force or "fluid" called "animal magnetism" within the universe that influences the health of the human body. He experimented with magnets to affect this field in order to produce healing. By around 1774, he had concluded that the same effect could be created by passing the hands in front of the subject's body, later referred to as making "Mesmeric passes".

In 1784, at the request of King Louis XVI, two Royal Commissions on Animal Magnetism were specifically charged with (separately) investigating the claims made by one Charles d'Eslon (1750–1786), a disaffected student of Mesmer, for the existence of a substantial (rather than metaphorical, as Mesmer supposed) "animal magnetism", 'le magnétisme animal', and of a similarly physical "magnetic fluid", 'le fluide magnétique'. Among the investigators were the scientist, Antoine Lavoisier, an expert in electricity and terrestrial magnetism, Benjamin Franklin, and an expert in pain control, Joseph-Ignace Guillotin.

The Commissioners investigated the practices of d'Eslon; and, although they accepted, without question, that Mesmer's "cures" were, indeed, "cures", they did not investigate whether (or not) Mesmer was the agent of those "cures". Significantly, in their investigations of d'Eslon's procedures, they conducted an expansive series of randomized controlled trials, the experimental protocols of which were was designed by Lavoisier, including the application of both "sham" and "genuine" procedures and, significantly, the first use of "blindfolding" of both the investigators and their subjects.

From their investigations both Commissions concluded that there was no evidence of any kind to support d'Eslon's claim for the substantial physical existence of either his supposed "animal magnetism" or his supposed "magnetic fluid"; and, in the process, they determined that all of the effects they had observed could be directly attributed to a physiological (rather than metaphysical) agency—namely, that all of the experimentally observed phenomena could be directly attributed to "contact", "imagination", and/or "imitation".

Eventually, Mesmer left Paris and went back to Vienna to practise mesmerism.

James Braid 

Following the French committee's findings, Dugald Stewart, an influential academic philosopher of the "Scottish School of Common Sense", encouraged physicians in his Elements of the Philosophy of the Human Mind (1818) to salvage elements of Mesmerism by replacing the supernatural theory of "animal magnetism" with a new interpretation based upon "common sense" laws of physiology and psychology. Braid quotes the following passage from Stewart:

In Braid's day, the Scottish School of Common Sense provided the dominant theories of academic psychology, and Braid refers to other philosophers within this tradition throughout his writings. Braid therefore revised the theory and practice of Mesmerism and developed his own method of hypnotism as a more rational and common sense alternative.

Despite briefly toying with the name "rational Mesmerism", Braid ultimately chose to emphasise the unique aspects of his approach, carrying out informal experiments throughout his career in order to refute practices that invoked supernatural forces and demonstrating instead the role of ordinary physiological and psychological processes such as suggestion and focused attention in producing the observed effects.

Braid worked very closely with his friend and ally the eminent physiologist Professor William Benjamin Carpenter, an early neuro-psychologist who introduced the "ideo-motor reflex" theory of suggestion. Carpenter had observed instances of expectation and imagination apparently influencing involuntary muscle movement. A classic example of the ideo-motor principle in action is the so-called "Chevreul pendulum" (named after Michel Eugène Chevreul). Chevreul claimed that divinatory pendulae were made to swing by unconscious muscle movements brought about by focused concentration alone.

Braid soon assimilated Carpenter's observations into his own theory, realising that the effect of focusing attention was to enhance the ideo-motor reflex response. Braid extended Carpenter's theory to encompass the influence of the mind upon the body more generally, beyond the muscular system, and therefore referred to the "ideo-dynamic" response and coined the term "psycho-physiology" to refer to the study of general mind/body interaction.

In his later works, Braid reserved the term "hypnotism" for cases in which subjects entered a state of amnesia resembling sleep. For other cases, he spoke of a "mono-ideodynamic" principle to emphasise that the eye-fixation induction technique worked by narrowing the subject's attention to a single idea or train of thought ("monoideism"), which amplified the effect of the consequent "dominant idea" upon the subject's body by means of the ideo-dynamic principle.

Hysteria vs. suggestion 
For several decades Braid's work became more influential abroad than in his own country, except for a handful of followers, most notably Dr. John Milne Bramwell. The eminent neurologist Dr. George Miller Beard took Braid's theories to America. Meanwhile, his works were translated into German by William Thierry Preyer, Professor of Physiology at Jena University. The psychiatrist Albert Moll subsequently continued German research, publishing Hypnotism in 1889. France became the focal point for the study of Braid's ideas after the eminent neurologist Dr. Étienne Eugène Azam translated Braid's last manuscript (On Hypnotism, 1860) into French and presented Braid's research to the French Academy of Sciences. At the request of Azam, Paul Broca, and others, the French Academy of Science, which had investigated Mesmerism in 1784, examined Braid's writings shortly after his death.

Azam's enthusiasm for hypnotism influenced Ambroise-Auguste Liébeault, a country doctor. Hippolyte Bernheim discovered Liébeault's enormously popular group hypnotherapy clinic and subsequently became an influential hypnotist. The study of hypnotism subsequently revolved around the fierce debate between Bernheim and Jean-Martin Charcot, the two most influential figures in late 19th-century hypnotism.

Charcot operated a clinic at the Pitié-Salpêtrière Hospital (thus, known as the "Paris School" or the "Salpêtrière School"), while Bernheim had a clinic in Nancy (known as the "Nancy School"). Charcot, who was influenced more by the Mesmerists, argued that hypnotism was an abnormal state of nervous functioning found only in certain hysterical women. He claimed that it manifested in a series of physical reactions that could be divided into distinct stages. Bernheim argued that anyone could be hypnotised, that it was an extension of normal psychological functioning, and that its effects were due to suggestion. After decades of debate, Bernheim's view dominated. Charcot's theory is now just a historical curiosity.

Pierre Janet 
Pierre Janet (1859–1947) reported studies on a hypnotic subject in 1882. Charcot subsequently appointed him director of the psychological laboratory at the Salpêtrière in 1889, after Janet had completed his PhD, which dealt with psychological automatism. In 1898, Janet was appointed psychology lecturer at the Sorbonne, and in 1902 he became chair of experimental and comparative psychology at the Collège de France. Janet reconciled elements of his views with those of Bernheim and his followers, developing his own sophisticated hypnotic psychotherapy based upon the concept of psychological dissociation, which, at the turn of the century, rivalled Freud's attempt to provide a more comprehensive theory of psychotherapy.

Sigmund Freud 
Sigmund Freud (1856–1939), the founder of psychoanalysis, studied hypnotism at the Paris School and briefly visited the Nancy School.

At first, Freud was an enthusiastic proponent of hypnotherapy. He "initially hypnotised patients and pressed on their foreheads to help them concentrate while attempting to recover (supposedly) repressed memories", and he soon began to emphasise hypnotic regression and ab reaction (catharsis) as therapeutic methods. He wrote a favorable encyclopedia article on hypnotism, translated one of Bernheim's works into German, and published an influential series of case studies with his colleague Joseph Breuer entitled Studies on Hysteria (1895). This became the founding text of the subsequent tradition known as "hypno-analysis" or "regression hypnotherapy".

However, Freud gradually abandoned hypnotism in favour of psychoanalysis, emphasising free association and interpretation of the unconscious. Struggling with the great expense of time that psychoanalysis required, Freud later suggested that it might be combined with hypnotic suggestion to hasten the outcome of treatment, but that this would probably weaken the outcome: "It is very probable, too, that the application of our therapy to numbers will compel us to alloy the pure gold of analysis plentifully with the copper of direct [hypnotic] suggestion."

Only a handful of Freud's followers, however, were sufficiently qualified in hypnosis to attempt the synthesis. Their work had a limited influence on the hypno-therapeutic approaches now known variously as "hypnotic regression", "hypnotic progression", and "hypnoanalysis".

Émile Coué 

Émile Coué (1857–1926) assisted Ambroise-Auguste Liébeault for around two years at Nancy. After practising for several months employing the "hypnosis" of Liébeault and Bernheim's Nancy School, he abandoned their approach altogether. Later, Coué developed a new approach (c.1901) based on Braid-style "hypnotism", direct hypnotic suggestion, and ego-strengthening which eventually became known as La méthode Coué. According to Charles Baudouin, Coué founded what became known as the New Nancy School, a loose collaboration of practitioners who taught and promoted his views. Coué's method did not emphasise "sleep" or deep relaxation, but instead focused upon autosuggestion involving a specific series of suggestion tests. Although Coué argued that he was no longer using hypnosis, followers such as Charles Baudouin viewed his approach as a form of light self-hypnosis. Coué's method became a renowned self-help and psychotherapy technique, which contrasted with psychoanalysis and prefigured self-hypnosis and cognitive therapy.

Clark L. Hull 
The next major development came from behavioural psychology in American university research. Clark L. Hull (1884–1952), an eminent American psychologist, published the first major compilation of laboratory studies on hypnosis, Hypnosis & Suggestibility (1933), in which he proved that hypnosis and sleep had nothing in common. Hull published many quantitative findings from hypnosis and suggestion experiments and encouraged research by mainstream psychologists. Hull's behavioural psychology interpretation of hypnosis, emphasising conditioned reflexes, rivalled the Freudian psycho-dynamic interpretation which emphasised unconscious transference.

Dave Elman 
Although Dave Elman (1900–1967) was a noted radio host, comedian, and songwriter, he also made a name as a hypnotist. He led many courses for physicians, and in 1964 wrote the book Findings in Hypnosis, later to be retitled Hypnotherapy (published by Westwood Publishing). Perhaps the most well-known aspect of Elman's legacy is his method of induction, which was originally fashioned for speed work and later adapted for the use of medical professionals.

Milton Erickson 
Milton Erickson (1901–1980), the founding president of the American Society for Clinical Hypnosis and a fellow of the American Psychiatric Association, the American Psychological Association, and the American Psychopathological Association, was one of the most influential post-war hypnotherapists. He wrote several books and journal articles on the subject. During the 1960s, Erickson popularised a new branch of hypnotherapy, known as Ericksonian therapy, characterised primarily by indirect suggestion, "metaphor" (actually analogies), confusion techniques, and double binds in place of formal hypnotic inductions. However, the difference between Erickson's methods and traditional hypnotism led contemporaries such as André Weitzenhoffer to question whether he was practising "hypnosis" at all, and his approach remains in question. 

But during numerous witnessed and recorded encounters in clinical, experimental, and academic settings Erickson was able to evoke examples of classic hypnotic phenomena such as positive and negative hallucinations, anesthesia, analgesia (in childbirth and even terminal cancer patients), catalepsy, regression to provable events in subjects' early lives and even into infantile reflexology. Erickson stated in his own writings that there was no correlation between hypnotic depth and therapeutic success and that the quality of the applied psychotherapy outweighed the need for deep hypnosis in many cases. Hypnotic depth was to be pursued for research purposes.<ref></Erickson, Rossi, and Rossi: "Hypnotic Realities" New York, Irvington Publishers 1976>
</ref>

Cognitive-behavioural 
In the latter half of the 20th century, two factors contributed to the development of the cognitive-behavioural approach to hypnosis:
 Cognitive and behavioural theories of the nature of hypnosis (influenced by the theories of Sarbin and Barber) became increasingly influential.
 The therapeutic practices of hypnotherapy and various forms of cognitive behavioural therapy overlapped and influenced each other.

Although cognitive-behavioural theories of hypnosis must be distinguished from cognitive-behavioural approaches to hypnotherapy, they share similar concepts, terminology, and assumptions and have been integrated by influential researchers and clinicians such as Irving Kirsch, Steven Jay Lynn, and others.

At the outset of cognitive behavioural therapy during the 1950s, hypnosis was used by early behaviour therapists such as Joseph Wolpe and also by early cognitive therapists such as Albert Ellis. Barber, Spanos, and Chaves introduced the term "cognitive-behavioural" to describe their "nonstate" theory of hypnosis in Hypnosis, imagination, and human potentialities. However, Clark L. Hull had introduced a behavioural psychology as far back as 1933, which in turn was preceded by Ivan Pavlov. Indeed, the earliest theories and practices of hypnotism, even those of Braid, resemble the cognitive-behavioural orientation in some respects.

Definition 

A person in a state of hypnosis has focused attention, and has increased suggestibility.

It could be said that hypnotic suggestion is explicitly intended to make use of the placebo effect. For example, in 1994, Irving Kirsch characterized hypnosis as a "non-deceptive placebo", i.e., a method that openly makes use of suggestion and employs methods to amplify its effects.

A definition of hypnosis, derived from academic psychology, was provided in 2005, when the Society for Psychological Hypnosis, Division 30 of the American Psychological Association (APA), published the following formal definition:

Michael Nash provides a list of eight definitions of hypnosis by different authors, in addition to his own view that hypnosis is "a special case of psychological regression":
 Janet, near the turn of the century, and more recently Ernest Hilgard ..., have defined hypnosis in terms of dissociation.
 Social psychologists Sarbin and Coe ... have described hypnosis in terms of role theory. Hypnosis is a role that people play; they act "as if" they were hypnotised.
 T. X. Barber ... defined hypnosis in terms of nonhypnotic behavioural parameters, such as task motivation and the act of labeling the situation as hypnosis.
 In his early writings, Weitzenhoffer ... conceptualised hypnosis as a state of enhanced suggestibility. Most recently ... he has defined hypnotism as "a form of influence by one person exerted on another through the medium or agency of suggestion."
 Psychoanalysts Gill and Brenman ... described hypnosis by using the psychoanalytic concept of "regression in the service of the ego".
 Edmonston ... has assessed hypnosis as being merely a state of relaxation.
 Spiegel and Spiegel... have implied that hypnosis is a biological capacity.
 Erickson ... is considered the leading exponent of the position that hypnosis is a special, inner-directed, altered state of functioning.

Joe Griffin and Ivan Tyrrell (the originators of the human givens approach) define hypnosis as "any artificial way of accessing the REM state, the same brain state in which dreaming occurs" and suggest that this definition, when properly understood, resolves "many of the mysteries and controversies surrounding hypnosis". They see the REM state as being vitally important for life itself, for programming in our instinctive knowledge initially (after Dement and Jouvet) and then for adding to this throughout life. They attempt to explain this by asserting that, in a sense, all learning is post-hypnotic, which they say explains why the number of ways people can be put into a hypnotic state are so varied: according to them, anything that focuses a person's attention, inward or outward, puts them into a trance.

Induction 

Hypnosis is normally preceded by a "hypnotic induction" technique. Traditionally, this was interpreted as a method of putting the subject into a "hypnotic trance"; however, subsequent "nonstate" theorists have viewed it differently, seeing it as a means of heightening client expectation, defining their role, focusing attention, etc. The induction techniques and methods are depended on the depth of hypnosis trance level and for each stage of trance, the number of which in some sources ranges from 30 stages to 50 stages, there are different types of inductions. There are several different induction techniques. One of the most influential methods was Braid's "eye-fixation" technique, also known as "Braidism". Many variations of the eye-fixation approach exist, including the induction used in the Stanford Hypnotic Susceptibility Scale (SHSS), the most widely used research tool in the field of hypnotism. Braid's original description of his induction is as follows:
Braid later acknowledged that the hypnotic induction technique was not necessary in every case, and subsequent researchers have generally found that on average it contributes less than previously expected to the effect of hypnotic suggestions. Variations and alternatives to the original hypnotic induction techniques were subsequently developed. However, this method is still considered authoritative. In 1941, Robert White wrote: "It can be safely stated that nine out of ten hypnotic techniques call for reclining posture, muscular relaxation, and optical fixation followed by eye closure."

Suggestion 

When James Braid first described hypnotism, he did not use the term "suggestion" but referred instead to the act of focusing the conscious mind of the subject upon a single dominant idea. Braid's main therapeutic strategy involved stimulating or reducing physiological functioning in different regions of the body. In his later works, however, Braid placed increasing emphasis upon the use of a variety of different verbal and non-verbal forms of suggestion, including the use of "waking suggestion" and self-hypnosis. Subsequently, Hippolyte Bernheim shifted the emphasis from the physical state of hypnosis on to the psychological process of verbal suggestion:

Bernheim's conception of the primacy of verbal suggestion in hypnotism dominated the subject throughout the 20th century, leading some authorities to declare him the father of modern hypnotism.

Contemporary hypnotism uses a variety of suggestion forms including direct verbal suggestions, "indirect" verbal suggestions such as requests or insinuations, metaphors and other rhetorical figures of speech, and non-verbal suggestion in the form of mental imagery, voice tonality, and physical manipulation. A distinction is commonly made between suggestions delivered "permissively" and those delivered in a more "authoritarian" manner. Harvard hypnotherapist Deirdre Barrett writes that most modern research suggestions are designed to bring about immediate responses, whereas hypnotherapeutic suggestions are usually post-hypnotic ones that are intended to trigger responses affecting behaviour for periods ranging from days to a lifetime in duration. The hypnotherapeutic ones are often repeated in multiple sessions before they achieve peak effectiveness.

Conscious and unconscious mind 
Some hypnotists view suggestion as a form of communication that is directed primarily to the subject's conscious mind, whereas others view it as a means of communicating with the "unconscious" or "subconscious" mind. These concepts were introduced into hypnotism at the end of the 19th century by Sigmund Freud and Pierre Janet. Sigmund Freud's psychoanalytic theory describes conscious thoughts as being at the surface of the mind and unconscious processes as being deeper in the mind. Braid, Bernheim, and other Victorian pioneers of hypnotism did not refer to the unconscious mind but saw hypnotic suggestions as being addressed to the subject's conscious mind. Indeed, Braid actually defines hypnotism as focused (conscious) attention upon a dominant idea (or suggestion). Different views regarding the nature of the mind have led to different conceptions of suggestion. Hypnotists who believe that responses are mediated primarily by an "unconscious mind", like Milton Erickson, make use of indirect suggestions such as metaphors or stories whose intended meaning may be concealed from the subject's conscious mind. The concept of subliminal suggestion depends upon this view of the mind. By contrast, hypnotists who believe that responses to suggestion are primarily mediated by the conscious mind, such as Theodore Barber and Nicholas Spanos, have tended to make more use of direct verbal suggestions and instructions.

Ideo-dynamic reflex 

The first neuropsychological theory of hypnotic suggestion was introduced early by James Braid who adopted his friend and colleague William Carpenter's theory of the ideo-motor reflex response to account for the phenomenon of hypnotism. Carpenter had observed from close examination of everyday experience that, under certain circumstances, the mere idea of a muscular movement could be sufficient to produce a reflexive, or automatic, contraction or movement of the muscles involved, albeit in a very small degree. Braid extended Carpenter's theory to encompass the observation that a wide variety of bodily responses besides muscular movement can be thus affected, for example, the idea of sucking a lemon can automatically stimulate salivation, a secretory response. Braid, therefore, adopted the term "ideo-dynamic", meaning "by the power of an idea", to explain a broad range of "psycho-physiological" (mind–body) phenomena. Braid coined the term "mono-ideodynamic" to refer to the theory that hypnotism operates by concentrating attention on a single idea in order to amplify the ideo-dynamic reflex response. Variations of the basic ideo-motor, or ideo-dynamic, theory of suggestion have continued to exercise considerable influence over subsequent theories of hypnosis, including those of Clark L. Hull, Hans Eysenck, and Ernest Rossi. In Victorian psychology the word "idea" encompasses any mental representation, including mental imagery, memories, etc.

Susceptibility 

Braid made a rough distinction between different stages of hypnosis, which he termed the first and second conscious stage of hypnotism; he later replaced this with a distinction between "sub-hypnotic", "full hypnotic", and "hypnotic coma" stages. Jean-Martin Charcot made a similar distinction between stages which he named somnambulism, lethargy, and catalepsy. However, Ambroise-Auguste Liébeault and Hippolyte Bernheim introduced more complex hypnotic "depth" scales based on a combination of behavioural, physiological, and subjective responses, some of which were due to direct suggestion and some of which were not. In the first few decades of the 20th century, these early clinical "depth" scales were superseded by more sophisticated "hypnotic susceptibility" scales based on experimental research. The most influential were the Davis–Husband and Friedlander–Sarbin scales developed in the 1930s. André Weitzenhoffer and Ernest R. Hilgard developed the Stanford Scale of Hypnotic Susceptibility in 1959, consisting of 12 suggestion test items following a standardised hypnotic eye-fixation induction script, and this has become one of the most widely referenced research tools in the field of hypnosis. Soon after, in 1962, Ronald Shor and Emily Carota Orne developed a similar group scale called the Harvard Group Scale of Hypnotic Susceptibility (HGSHS).

Whereas the older "depth scales" tried to infer the level of "hypnotic trance" from supposed observable signs such as spontaneous amnesia, most subsequent scales have measured the degree of observed or self-evaluated responsiveness to specific suggestion tests such as direct suggestions of arm rigidity (catalepsy). The Stanford, Harvard, HIP, and most other susceptibility scales convert numbers into an assessment of a person's susceptibility as "high", "medium", or "low". Approximately 80% of the population are medium, 10% are high, and 10% are low. There is some controversy as to whether this is distributed on a "normal" bell-shaped curve or whether it is bi-modal with a small "blip" of people at the high end. Hypnotisability Scores are highly stable over a person's lifetime. Research by Deirdre Barrett has found that there are two distinct types of highly susceptible subjects, which she terms fantasisers and dissociaters. Fantasisers score high on absorption scales, find it easy to block out real-world stimuli without hypnosis, spend much time daydreaming, report imaginary companions as a child, and grew up with parents who encouraged imaginary play. Dissociaters often have a history of childhood abuse or other trauma, learned to escape into numbness, and to forget unpleasant events. Their association to "daydreaming" was often going blank rather than creating vividly recalled fantasies. Both score equally high on formal scales of hypnotic susceptibility.

Individuals with dissociative identity disorder have the highest hypnotisability of any clinical group, followed by those with post-traumatic stress disorder.

Applications 
There are numerous applications for hypnosis across multiple fields of interest, including medical/psychotherapeutic uses, military uses, self-improvement, and entertainment. The American Medical Association currently has no official stance on the medical use of hypnosis.

Hypnosis has been used as a supplemental approach to cognitive behavioral therapy since as early as 1949. Hypnosis was defined in relation to classical conditioning; where the words of the therapist were the stimuli and the hypnosis would be the conditioned response. Some traditional cognitive behavioral therapy methods were based in classical conditioning. It would include inducing a relaxed state and introducing a feared stimulus. One way of inducing the relaxed state was through hypnosis.

Hypnotism has also been used in forensics, sports, education, physical therapy, and rehabilitation. Hypnotism has also been employed by artists for creative purposes, most notably the surrealist circle of André Breton who employed hypnosis, automatic writing, and sketches for creative purposes. Hypnotic methods have been used to re-experience drug states and mystical experiences. Self-hypnosis is popularly used to quit smoking, alleviate stress and anxiety, promote weight loss, and induce sleep hypnosis. Stage hypnosis can persuade people to perform unusual public feats.

Some people have drawn analogies between certain aspects of hypnotism and areas such as crowd psychology, religious hysteria, and ritual trances in preliterate tribal cultures.

Hypnotherapy 

Hypnotherapy is a use of hypnosis in psychotherapy. It is used by licensed physicians, psychologists, and others. Physicians and psychologists may use hypnosis to treat depression, anxiety, eating disorders, sleep disorders, compulsive gambling, phobias and post-traumatic stress, while certified hypnotherapists who are not physicians or psychologists often treat smoking and weight management. Hypnotherapy was historically used in psychiatric and legal settings to enhance the recall of repressed or degraded memories, but this application of the technique has declined as scientific evidence accumulated that hypnotherapy can increase confidence in false memories.

Hypnotherapy is viewed as a helpful adjunct by proponents, having additive effects when treating psychological disorders, such as these, along with scientifically proven cognitive therapies.  The effectiveness of hypnotherapy has not yet been accurately assessed, and, due to the lack of evidence indicating any level of efficiency, it is regarded as a type of alternative medicine by numerous reputable medical organisations, such as the National Health Service.

Preliminary research has expressed brief hypnosis interventions as possibly being a useful tool for managing painful HIV-DSP because of its history of usefulness in pain management, its long-term effectiveness of brief interventions, the ability to teach self-hypnosis to patients, the cost-effectiveness of the intervention, and the advantage of using such an intervention as opposed to the use of pharmaceutical drugs.

Modern hypnotherapy has been used, with varying success, in a variety of forms, such as:

 Addictions
 Age regression hypnotherapy (or "hypnoanalysis")
 Cognitive-behavioural hypnotherapy, or clinical hypnosis combined with elements of cognitive behavioural therapy
 Ericksonian hypnotherapy
 Fears and phobia
 Habit control
 Pain management
 Psychotherapy
 Relaxation
 Reduce patient behavior (e.g., scratching) that hinders the treatment of skin disease
 Soothing anxious surgical patients
 Sports performance
 Weight loss

In a January 2001 article in Psychology Today, Harvard psychologist Deirdre Barrett wrote:
 Barrett described specific ways this is operationalised for habit change and amelioration of phobias. In her 1998 book of hypnotherapy case studies, she reviews the clinical research on hypnosis with dissociative disorders, smoking cessation, and insomnia, and describes successful treatments of these complaints.

In a July 2001 article for Scientific American titled "The Truth and the Hype of Hypnosis", Michael Nash wrote that, "using hypnosis, scientists have temporarily created hallucinations, compulsions, certain types of memory loss, false memories, and delusions in the laboratory so that these phenomena can be studied in a controlled environment."

Menopause 
There is evidence supporting the use of hypnotherapy in the treatment of menopause related symptoms, including hot flashes. The North American Menopause Society recommends hypnotherapy for the nonhormonal management of menopause-associated vasomotor symptoms, giving it the highest level of evidence.

Irritable bowel syndrome 
Hypnotherapy has been studied for the treatment of irritable bowel syndrome. Hypnosis for IBS has received moderate support in the National Institute for Health and Clinical Excellence guidance published for UK health services. It has been used as an aid or alternative to chemical anesthesia, and it has been studied as a way to soothe skin ailments.

Pain management 
A number of studies show that hypnosis can reduce the pain experienced during burn-wound debridement, bone marrow aspirations, and childbirth. The International Journal of Clinical and Experimental Hypnosis found that hypnosis relieved the pain of 75% of 933 subjects participating in 27 different experiments.

Hypnosis is effective in decreasing the fear of cancer treatment reducing pain from and coping with cancer and other chronic conditions. Nausea and other symptoms related to incurable diseases may also be managed with hypnosis. Some practitioners have claimed hypnosis might help boost the immune system of people with cancer. However, according to the American Cancer Society, "available scientific evidence does not support the idea that hypnosis can influence the development or progression of cancer."

Hypnosis has been used as a pain relieving technique during dental surgery, and related pain management regimens as well. Researchers like Jerjes and his team have reported that hypnosis can help even those patients who have acute to severe orodental pain. Additionally, Meyerson and Uziel have suggested that hypnotic methods have been found to be highly fruitful for alleviating anxiety in patients with severe dental phobia.

For some psychologists who uphold the altered state theory of hypnosis, pain relief in response to hypnosis is said to be the result of the brain's dual-processing functionality. This effect is obtained either through the process of selective attention or dissociation, in which both theories involve the presence of activity in pain receptive regions of the brain, and a difference in the processing of the stimuli by the hypnotised subject.

The American Psychological Association published a study comparing the effects of hypnosis, ordinary suggestion, and placebo in reducing pain. The study found that highly suggestible individuals experienced a greater reduction in pain from hypnosis compared with placebo, whereas less suggestible subjects experienced no pain reduction from hypnosis when compared with placebo. Ordinary non-hypnotic suggestion also caused reduction in pain compared to placebo, but was able to reduce pain in a wider range of subjects (both high and low suggestible) than hypnosis. The results showed that it is primarily the subject's responsiveness to suggestion, whether within the context of hypnosis or not, that is the main determinant of causing reduction in pain.

Other 
The success rate for habit control is varied. A meta-study researching hypnosis as a quit-smoking tool found it had a 20 to 30 percent success rate, while a 2007 study of patients hospitalised for cardiac and pulmonary ailments found that smokers who used hypnosis to quit smoking doubled their chances of success. In 2019, a Cochrane review was unable to find evidence of benefit of hypnosis in smoking cessation, and suggested if there is, it is small at best.

Hypnosis may be useful as an adjunct therapy for weight loss. A 1996 meta-analysis studying hypnosis combined with cognitive behavioural therapy found that people using both treatments lost more weight than people using cognitive behavioural therapy alone. The virtual gastric band procedure mixes hypnosis with hypnopedia. The hypnosis instructs the stomach that it is smaller than it really is, and hypnopedia reinforces alimentary habits. A 2016 pilot study found that there was no significant difference in effectiveness between VGB hypnotherapy and relaxation hypnotherapy.

Controversy surrounds the use of hypnotherapy to retrieve memories, especially those from early childhood or (supposed) past-lives. The American Medical Association and the American Psychological Association caution against recovered-memory therapy in cases of alleged childhood trauma, stating that "it is impossible, without corroborative evidence, to distinguish a true memory from a false one." Past life regression, meanwhile, is often viewed with skepticism.

American psychiatric nurses, in most medical facilities, are allowed to administer hypnosis to patients in order to relieve symptoms such as anxiety, arousal, negative behaviours, uncontrollable behaviour, and to improve self-esteem and confidence. This is permitted only when they have been completely trained about their clinical side effects and while under supervision when administering it.

Military 
A 2006 declassified 1966 document obtained by the US Freedom of Information Act archive shows that hypnosis was investigated for military applications. The full paper explores the potentials of operational uses. The overall conclusion of the study was that there was no evidence that hypnosis could be used for military applications, and no clear evidence whether "hypnosis" is a definable phenomenon outside ordinary suggestion, motivation, and subject expectancy. According to the document:

Furthermore, the document states that:

The study concluded that there are no reliable accounts of its effective use by an intelligence service in history.

Research into hypnosis in military applications is further verified by the Project MKUltra experiments, also conducted by the CIA. According to Congressional testimony, the CIA experimented with utilising LSD and hypnosis for mind control. Many of these programs were done domestically and on participants who were not informed of the study's purposes or that they would be given drugs.

Self-hypnosis 

Self-hypnosis happens when a person hypnotises oneself, commonly involving the use of autosuggestion. The technique is often used to increase motivation for a diet, to quit smoking, or to reduce stress. People who practise self-hypnosis sometimes require assistance; some people use devices known as mind machines to assist in the process, whereas others use hypnotic recordings.

Self-hypnosis is claimed to help with stage fright, relaxation, and physical well-being.

Stage hypnosis 

Stage hypnosis is a form of entertainment, traditionally employed in a club or theatre before an audience. Due to stage hypnotists' showmanship, many people believe that hypnosis is a form of mind control. Stage hypnotists typically attempt to hypnotise the entire audience and then select individuals who are "under" to come up on stage and perform embarrassing acts, while the audience watches. However, the effects of stage hypnosis are probably due to a combination of psychological factors, participant selection, suggestibility, physical manipulation, stagecraft, and trickery. The desire to be the centre of attention, having an excuse to violate their own fear suppressors, and the pressure to please are thought to convince subjects to "play along". Books by stage hypnotists sometimes explicitly describe the use of deception in their acts; for example, Ormond McGill's New Encyclopedia of Stage Hypnosis describes an entire "fake hypnosis" act that depends upon the use of private whispers throughout.

Music 
The idea of music as hypnosis developed from the work of Franz Mesmer. Instruments such as pianos, violins, harps and, especially, the glass harmonica often featured in Mesmer's treatments; and were considered to contribute to Mesmer's success.

Hypnotic music became an important part in the development of a 'physiological psychology' that regarded the hypnotic state as an 'automatic' phenomenon that links to physical reflex. In their experiments with sound hypnosis, Jean-Martin Charcot used gongs and tuning forks, and Ivan Pavlov used bells. The intention behind their experiments was to prove that physiological response to sound could be automatic, bypassing the conscious mind.

Satanic brainwashing 

In the 1980s and 1990s, a moral panic took place in the US fearing Satanic ritual abuse. As part of this, certain books such as The Devil's Disciples claimed that some bands, particularly in the musical genre of heavy metal, brainwashed American teenagers with subliminal messages to lure them into the worship of the devil, sexual immorality, murder, and especially suicide.

Crime 
Various people have been suspected of or convicted for hypnosis-related crimes, including robbery and sexual abuse.

In 1951, Palle Hardrup shot and killed two people during a botched robbery in Copenhagen - see Hypnosis murders. Hardrup claimed that his friend and former cellmate Bjørn Schouw Nielsen had hypnotised him to commit the robbery, inadvertently causing the deaths. Both were sentenced to jail time.

In 2011, a Russian "evil hypnotist" was suspected of tricking customers in banks around Stavropol into giving away thousands of pounds' worth of money. According to the local police, he would approach them and make them withdraw all of the money from their bank accounts, which they would then freely give to the man. A similar incident was reported in London in 2014, where a video seemingly showed a robber hypnotising a shopkeeper before robbing him. The victim did nothing to stop the robber from looting his pockets and taking his cash, only calling out the thief when he was already getting away.

In 2013, the then-40-year-old amateur hypnotist Timothy Porter attempted to sexually abuse his female weight-loss client. She reported awaking from a trance and finding him behind her with his pants down, telling her to touch herself. He was subsequently called to court and included on the sex offender list. In 2015, Gary Naraido, then 52, was sentenced to 10 years in prison for several hypnosis-related sexual abuse charges. Besides the primary charge by a 22-year-old woman who he sexually abused in a hotel under the guise of a free therapy session, he also admitted to having sexually assaulted a 14-year-old girl. In December 2018, a Brazilian medium named João Teixeira de Faria (also known as "João de Deus"), famous for performing Spiritual Surgeries through hypnosis techniques, was accused of sexual abuse by 12 women. In 2016 an Ohio lawyer got sentenced to 12 years of prison for hypnotising his clients while telling them it was just a mindfulness exercise.

Sexual

State vs. nonstate 
The central theoretical disagreement regarding hypnosis is known as the "state versus nonstate" debate. When Braid introduced the concept of hypnotism, he equivocated over the nature of the "state", sometimes describing it as a specific sleep-like neurological state comparable to animal hibernation or yogic meditation, while at other times he emphasised that hypnotism encompasses a number of different stages or states that are an extension of ordinary psychological and physiological processes. Overall, Braid appears to have moved from a more "special state" understanding of hypnotism toward a more complex "nonstate" orientation.

State theorists interpret the effects of hypnotism as due primarily to a specific, abnormal, and uniform psychological or physiological state of some description, often referred to as "hypnotic trance" or an "altered state of consciousness". Nonstate theorists rejected the idea of hypnotic trance and interpret the effects of hypnotism as due to a combination of multiple task-specific factors derived from normal cognitive, behavioural, and social psychology, such as social role-perception and favorable motivation (Sarbin), active imagination and positive cognitive set (Barber), response expectancy (Kirsch), and the active use of task-specific subjective strategies (Spanos). The personality psychologist Robert White is often cited as providing one of the first nonstate definitions of hypnosis in a 1941 article:

Put simply, it is often claimed that, whereas the older "special state" interpretation emphasises the difference between hypnosis and ordinary psychological processes, the "nonstate" interpretation emphasises their similarity.

Comparisons between hypnotised and non-hypnotised subjects suggest that, if a "hypnotic trance" does exist, it only accounts for a small proportion of the effects attributed to hypnotic suggestion, most of which can be replicated without hypnotic induction.

Hyper-suggestibility 
Braid can be taken to imply, in later writings, that hypnosis is largely a state of heightened suggestibility induced by expectation and focused attention. In particular, Hippolyte Bernheim became known as the leading proponent of the "suggestion theory" of hypnosis, at one point going so far as to declare that there is no hypnotic state, only heightened suggestibility. There is a general consensus that heightened suggestibility is an essential characteristic of hypnosis. In 1933, Clark L. Hull wrote:

Conditioned inhibition 
Ivan Pavlov stated that hypnotic suggestion provided the best example of a conditioned reflex response in human beings; i.e., that responses to suggestions were learned associations triggered by the words used:

He also believed that hypnosis was a "partial sleep", meaning that a generalised inhibition of cortical functioning could be encouraged to spread throughout regions of the brain. He observed that the various degrees of hypnosis did not significantly differ physiologically from the waking state and hypnosis depended on insignificant changes of environmental stimuli. Pavlov also suggested that lower-brain-stem mechanisms were involved in hypnotic conditioning.

Pavlov's ideas combined with those of his rival Vladimir Bekhterev and became the basis of hypnotic psychotherapy in the Soviet Union, as documented in the writings of his follower K.I. Platonov. Soviet theories of hypnotism subsequently influenced the writings of Western behaviourally oriented hypnotherapists such as Andrew Salter.

Neuropsychology 
Changes in brain activity have been found in some studies of highly responsive hypnotic subjects. These changes vary depending upon the type of suggestions being given. The state of light to medium hypnosis, where the body undergoes physical and mental relaxation, is associated with a pattern mostly of alpha waves. However, what these results indicate is unclear. They may indicate that suggestions genuinely produce changes in perception or experience that are not simply a result of imagination. However, in normal circumstances without hypnosis, the brain regions associated with motion detection are activated both when motion is seen and when motion is imagined, without any changes in the subjects' perception or experience. This may therefore indicate that highly suggestible hypnotic subjects are simply activating to a greater extent the areas of the brain used in imagination, without real perceptual changes. It is, however, premature to claim that hypnosis and meditation are mediated by similar brain systems and neural mechanisms.

Another study has demonstrated that a colour hallucination suggestion given to subjects in hypnosis activated colour-processing regions of the occipital cortex. A 2004 review of research examining the EEG laboratory work in this area concludes:

Studies have shown an association of hypnosis with stronger theta-frequency activity as well as with changes to the gamma-frequency activity. Neuroimaging techniques have been used to investigate neural correlates of hypnosis.

The induction phase of hypnosis may also affect the activity in brain regions that control intention and process conflict. Anna Gosline claims:

Dissociation 
Pierre Janet originally developed the idea of dissociation of consciousness from his work with hysterical patients. He believed that hypnosis was an example of dissociation, whereby areas of an individual's behavioural control separate from ordinary awareness. Hypnosis would remove some control from the conscious mind, and the individual would respond with autonomic, reflexive behaviour. Weitzenhoffer describes hypnosis via this theory as "dissociation of awareness from the majority of sensory and even strictly neural events taking place."

Neodissociation 
Ernest Hilgard, who developed the "neodissociation" theory of hypnotism, hypothesised that hypnosis causes the subjects to divide their consciousness voluntarily. One part responds to the hypnotist while the other retains awareness of reality. Hilgard made subjects take an ice water bath. None mentioned the water being cold or feeling pain. Hilgard then asked the subjects to lift their index finger if they felt pain and 70% of the subjects lifted their index finger. This showed that, even though the subjects were listening to the suggestive hypnotist, they still sensed the water's temperature.

Social role-taking theory 
The main theorist who pioneered the influential role-taking theory of hypnotism was Theodore Sarbin. Sarbin argued that hypnotic responses were motivated attempts to fulfill the socially constructed roles of hypnotic subjects. This has led to the misconception that hypnotic subjects are simply "faking". However, Sarbin emphasised the difference between faking, in which there is little subjective identification with the role in question, and role-taking, in which the subject not only acts externally in accord with the role but also subjectively identifies with it to some degree, acting, thinking, and feeling "as if" they are hypnotised. Sarbin drew analogies between role-taking in hypnosis and role-taking in other areas such as method acting, mental illness, and shamanic possession, etc. This interpretation of hypnosis is particularly relevant to understanding stage hypnosis, in which there is clearly strong peer pressure to comply with a socially constructed role by performing accordingly on a theatrical stage.

Hence, the social constructionism and role-taking theory of hypnosis suggests that individuals are enacting (as opposed to merely playing) a role and that really there is no such thing as a hypnotic trance. A socially constructed relationship is built depending on how much rapport has been established between the "hypnotist" and the subject (see Hawthorne effect, Pygmalion effect, and placebo effect).

Psychologists such as Robert Baker and Graham Wagstaff claim that what we call hypnosis is actually a form of learned social behaviour, a complex hybrid of social compliance, relaxation, and suggestibility that can account for many esoteric behavioural manifestations.

Cognitive-behavioural theory 
Barber, Spanos, and Chaves (1974) proposed a nonstate "cognitive-behavioural" theory of hypnosis, similar in some respects to Sarbin's social role-taking theory and building upon the earlier research of Barber. On this model, hypnosis is explained as an extension of ordinary psychological processes like imagination, relaxation, expectation, social compliance, etc. In particular, Barber argued that responses to hypnotic suggestions were mediated by a "positive cognitive set" consisting of positive expectations, attitudes, and motivation. Daniel Araoz subsequently coined the acronym "TEAM" to symbolise the subject's orientation to hypnosis in terms of "trust", "expectation", "attitude", and "motivation".

Barber et al. noted that similar factors appeared to mediate the response both to hypnotism and to cognitive behavioural therapy, in particular systematic desensitisation. Hence, research and clinical practice inspired by their interpretation has led to growing interest in the relationship between hypnotherapy and cognitive behavioural therapy.

Information theory 
An approach loosely based on information theory uses a brain-as-computer model. In adaptive systems, feedback increases the signal-to-noise ratio, which may converge towards a steady state. Increasing the signal-to-noise ratio enables messages to be more clearly received. The hypnotist's object is to use techniques to reduce interference and increase the receptability of specific messages (suggestions).

Systems theory 
Systems theory, in this context, may be regarded as an extension of Braid's original conceptualisation of hypnosis as involving "the brain and nervous system generally". Systems theory considers the nervous system's organisation into interacting subsystems. Hypnotic phenomena thus involve not only increased or decreased activity of particular subsystems, but also their interaction. A central phenomenon in this regard is that of feedback loops, which suggest a mechanism for creating hypnotic phenomena.

Societies 

There is a huge range of societies in England who train individuals in hypnosis; however, one of the longest-standing organisations is the British Society of Clinical and Academic Hypnosis (BSCAH). It origins date back to 1952 when a group of dentists set up the 'British Society of Dental Hypnosis'. Shortly after, a group of sympathetic medical practitioners merged with this fast-evolving organisation to form 'The Dental and Medical Society for the Study of Hypnosis'; and, in 1968, after various statutory amendments had taken place, the 'British Society of Medical and Dental Hypnosis' (BSMDH) was formed. This society always had close links with the Royal Society of Medicine and many of its members were involved in setting up a hypnosis section at this centre of medical research in London. And, in 1978, under the presidency of David Waxman, the Section of Medical and Dental Hypnosis was formed. A second society, the British Society of Experimental and Clinical Hypnosis (BSECH), was also set up a year before, in 1977, and this consisted of psychologists, doctors and dentists with an interest in hypnosis theory and practice. In 2007, the two societies merged to form the 'British Society of Clinical and Academic Hypnosis' (BSCAH). This society only trains health professionals and is interested in furthering research into clinical hypnosis.

The American Society of Clinical Hypnosis (ASCH) is unique among organisations for professionals using hypnosis because members must be licensed healthcare workers with graduate degrees. As an interdisciplinary organisation, ASCH not only provides a classroom to teach professionals how to use hypnosis as a tool in their practice, it provides professionals with a community of experts from different disciplines. The ASCH's missions statement is to provide and encourage education programs to further, in every ethical way, the knowledge, understanding, and application of hypnosis in health care; to encourage research and scientific publication in the field of hypnosis; to promote the further recognition and acceptance of hypnosis as an important tool in clinical health care and focus for scientific research; to cooperate with other professional societies that share mutual goals, ethics and interests; and to provide a professional community for those clinicians and researchers who use hypnosis in their work. The ASCH also publishes the American Journal of Clinical Hypnosis.

See also 
 List of hypnotists and list of fictional hypnotists

Historical figures 

 Alfred Binet
 James Braid
 John Milne Bramwell
 Emile Dantinne
 John Elliotson
 George Estabrooks
 Abbé Faria
 Ainslie Meares
 Franz Anton Mesmer
 Julian Ochorowicz
 Charles Lloyd Tuckey
 Otto Georg Wetterstrand

Modern researchers 

 Etzel Cardeña
 Alan Gauld
 Jack Stanley Gibson
 Ernest Hilgard
 Albert Abraham Mason
 Ainslie Meares
 Dylan Morgan
 Michel Weber

Related subjects 

 Covert hypnosis
 Guided meditation
 Highway hypnosis
 Hypnagogia
 Hypnoid state
 Hypnosis in popular culture
 Hypnosurgery
 List of ineffective cancer treatments
 Psychonautics
 Recreational hypnosis
 Royal Commission on Animal Magnetism
 Scientology and hypnosis
 Sedative (also known as sedative-hypnotic drug)
 The Zoist: A Journal of Cerebral Physiology & Mesmerism, and Their Applications to Human Welfare

References

Bibliography 

 Baudouin, C. (Paul, E & Paul, C. trans.), Suggestion and Autosuggestion: A Psychological and Pedagogical Study Based on the Investigations made by the New Nancy School, George Allen & Unwin, (London), 1920.
 
 
 Coates, James (1904), Human Magnetism; or, How to Hypnotise: A Practical Handbook for Students of Mesmerism, London: Nichols & Co.
 
 Glueck, B., "New Nancy School", The Psychoanalytic Review, Vol. 10, (January 1923), pp. 109–12.
 Harte, R., Hypnotism and the Doctors, Volume I: Animal Magnetism: Mesmer/De Puysegur, L.N. Fowler & Co., (London), 1902.
 Harte, R., Hypnotism and the Doctors, Volume II: The Second Commission; Dupotet And Lafontaine; The English School; Braid's Hypnotism; Statuvolism; Pathetism; Electro-Biology, L.N. Fowler & Co., (London), 1903.
 
 Yeates, L.B., James Braid: Surgeon, Gentleman Scientist, and Hypnotist, Ph.D. Dissertation, School of History and Philosophy of Science, Faculty of Arts & Social Sciences, University of New South Wales, January 2013.
 Yeates, Lindsay B. (2016a), "Émile Coué and his Method (I): The Chemist of Thought and Human Action", Australian Journal of Clinical Hypnotherapy & Hypnosis, Volume 38, No. 1, (Autumn 2016), pp. 3–27.
 Yeates, Lindsay B. (2016b), "Émile Coué and his Method (II): Hypnotism, Suggestion, Ego-Strengthening, and Autosuggestion", Australian Journal of Clinical Hypnotherapy & Hypnosis, Volume 38, No.1, (Autumn 2016), pp. 28–54.
 Yeates, Lindsay B. (2016c), "Émile Coué and his Method (III): Every Day in Every Way", Australian Journal of Clinical Hypnotherapy & Hypnosis, Volume 38, No. 1, (Autumn 2016), pp. 55–79.

External links 

 

 
Medical treatments
Mental states
Paranormal terminology
Articles containing video clips